Jean-Pierre Coopman (born 11 July 1946) is a retired Belgian boxer who is best known for his title fight against Muhammad Ali in 1976 in San Juan, Puerto Rico, which Ali won by KO in round 5.

Early life

Jean-Pierre Coopman was born on 11 July 1946, in the Flemish (northern Belgium) community of Ingelmunster. Early in life, he showed a gift for artistry. He was instructed in sculpting by his stepfather, and Coopman's first fully paid job was as a stone cutter. The stone-cutting he learned from childhood was more specifically that of an artisan. His skills were put to use, among other things, in reparations of the medieval churches of Belgium—most notably, Saint Nicholas' Church in Ghent. By having to perform a kind of historic preservation, using and applying tools from this ancient period, Coopman developed great strength in his arms and hands.

In young adulthood, he appears to have been a lover of night-life, but after sparring several times with Gilbert Montagne, a noted Belgian middleweight, Coopman was urged to pursue a ring career, or at least to try. By his own words, once the decision was made, Coopman at least gave up smoking, and cold turkey at that.

Fighting career

Though best known in fight circles as an opponent of Muhammad Ali, Coopman had been fighting for a half decade, before being granted his title shot at "The Greatest". He began in the amateur ranks, rising quickly enough to compete in the 1971 European Championships, where he was knocked out by a far more experienced (315 fights) Soviet fighter. He turned professional in 1972.

Coopman fought his early bouts primarily in Belgium, though he is recorded as having won an early match versus Harald Skog, in Oslo, Norway.  Coopman lost (via decision) to Rudie Lubbers of The Netherlands, in 1973.  Coopman's earlier record shows a disqualification victory over Terry Daniels, who had also received a title shot during his own career, versus Smokin' Joe Frazier, in January 1972.  Despite mixed fortunes, Coopman proved popular with his fellow Belgians, and by 1975, was able to pursue boxing as a full-time career; the company which employed him to sculpt, now paid him to fight, instead.

Coopman was said to have been one of the least-deserving boxers to fight for the heavyweight title. Ali had recently had his third fight with Joe Frazier, the "Thrilla in Manila", a match Ali later called, "the closest thing to death."  Understandably, the champion wanted an "easy" opponent.  The match was made almost by happenstance, as the promotion fell to George Kanter, a Belgian by birth. Kanter, after surveying the European scene, contacted Charles de Jager, Coopman's manager, and thus the match was made.  Coopman, unknown outside Belgium, was overwhelmed by the sudden fame.  Ali was a hero to him, and he was grateful for a title shot.

Coopman was dubbed "The Lion of Flanders" by the Western press, but he had never called himself that. The name was thought to be related to Coopman's birthday, 11 July, which is a national holiday in Flanders marking a military victory over the French, in 1302.

The fight took place in San Juan, Puerto Rico, on 20 February 1976 at Roberto Clemente Coliseum; the fight was not broadcast by Belgian media, as Coopman's native land was the first nation to ban boxing broadcasts. CBS Sports broadcast the bout in the US for free, in prime time. The bout was easy for Ali, who knocked out Coopman in round five.

After the Ali fight, Coopman became European champion after beating a Basque, Jose Urtain. Two months later, in Antwerp, he lost the title to Lucien Rodriguez of France. He retired in 1980. His last official fight was against Cookie Wallace.

In 1995 he fought Freddy De Kerpel while acting in the film Camping Cosmos.

As of 2007, Coopman was painting oil paintings of famous boxers. He was awarded a contract to sculpt a statue of fellow Belgian fighter Cyril Delannoit.

Coopman was the subject of "Lion", a tongue-in-cheek tribute by songwriter Freddy Blohm.

Professional boxing record

|-
|align="center" colspan=8|36 Wins (20 knockouts, 13 decisions, 3 DQ), 16 Losses (6 knockouts, 9 decisions, 1 DQ), 2 Draws 
|-
| align="center" style="border-style: none none solid solid; background: #e3e3e3"|Result
| align="center" style="border-style: none none solid solid; background: #e3e3e3"|Record
| align="center" style="border-style: none none solid solid; background: #e3e3e3"|Opponent
| align="center" style="border-style: none none solid solid; background: #e3e3e3"|Type
| align="center" style="border-style: none none solid solid; background: #e3e3e3"|Round
| align="center" style="border-style: none none solid solid; background: #e3e3e3"|Date
| align="center" style="border-style: none none solid solid; background: #e3e3e3"|Location
| align="center" style="border-style: none none solid solid; background: #e3e3e3"|Notes
|-align=center
| Draw
|36-16-2
|align=left| Freddy De Kerpel
|MD
|6
|1999-04-05
|align=left| Ghent, Belgium
|align=left|
|-
|Loss
|36-16-1
|align=left| Dragomir Milo Popovic
|TKO
|5
|1981-05-16
|align=left| Liège, Belgium
|align=left|
|-
|Win
|36-15-1
|align=left| Vincenzo Pesapane
|TKO
|3
|1981-04-03
|align=left| Piacenza, Italy
|align=left|
|-
|Loss
|35-15-1
|align=left| Pierre Babo Kabassu
|PTS
|8
|1980-12-25
|align=left| Izegem, Belgium
|align=left|
|-
|Loss
|35-14-1
|align=left| Rudie Lubbers
|TKO
|5
|1980-09-29
|align=left| Energiehal, Rotterdam, Netherlands
|align=left|
|-
|Loss
|35-13-1
|align=left| Albert Syben
|PTS
|10
|1980-06-27
|align=left| Sint-Jans-Molenbeek, Belgium
|align=left|
|-
|Loss
|35-12-1
|align=left| Winston Allenq
|KO
|1
|1980-05-01
|align=left| Izegem, Belgium
|align=left|
|-
|Win
|35-11-1
|align=left| Denton Ruddock
|PTS
|10
|1980-02-02
|align=left| Turnhout, Belgium
|align=left|
|-
|Loss
|34-11-1
|align=left| Avenamar Peralta
|PTS
|10
|1979-12-25
|align=left| Izegem, Belgium
|align=left|
|-
|Loss
|34-10-1
|align=left| George Butzbach
|PTS
|10
|1979-11-01
|align=left| Izegem, Belgium
|align=left|
|-
|Loss
|34-9-1
|align=left| Rudy Gauwe
|PTS
|12
|1978-09-30
|align=left| Turnhout, Belgium
|align=left|Belgium Heavyweight Title.
|-
|Win
|34-8-1
|align=left| Scotty Welsh
|DQ
|1
|1978-09-02
|align=left| Izegem, Belgium
|align=left|
|-
|Win
|33-8-1
|align=left| Mario Baruzzi
|TKO
|6
|1978-04-22
|align=left| La Louviere, Belgium
|align=left|
|-
|Win
|32-8-1
|align=left| Santiago Alberto Lovell
|TKO
|3
|1978-02-11
|align=left| Liège, Belgium
|align=left|
|-
|Loss
|31-8-1
|align=left| Alfredo Evangelista
|KO
|1
|1977-11-26
|align=left| Brussels, Belgium
|align=left|EBU Heavyweight Title.
|-
| Draw
|31-7-1
|align=left| Tony Moore
|PTS
|10
|1977-11-01
|align=left| Izegem, Belgium
|align=left|
|-
|Win
|31–7
|align=left| Kurt Luedecke
|PTS
|10
|1977-09-09
|align=left| Izegem, Belgium
|align=left|
|-
|Loss
|30–7
|align=left| Lucien Rodriguez
|UD
|15
|1977-05-07
|align=left| Antwerp
|align=left|EBU Heavyweight Title.
|-
|Win
|30–6
|align=left| Jose Manuel Urtain
|KO
|4
|1977-03-12
|align=left| Sportpaleis, Antwerp, Belgium
|align=left|EBU Heavyweight Title.
|-
|Loss
|29–6
|align=left| Lucien Rodriguez
|PTS
|10
|1977-01-15
|align=left| Brussels, Belgium
|align=left|
|-
|Win
|29–5
|align=left| Neville Meade
|PTS
|10
|1976-12-25
|align=left| Izegem, Belgium
|align=left|
|-
|Win
|28–5
|align=left| Roy Wallace
|PTS
|10
|1976-11-20
|align=left| Liège, Belgium
|align=left|
|-
|Win
|27–5
|align=left| George Jerome
|KO
|4
|1976-11-01
|align=left| Izegem, Belgium
|align=left|
|-
|Win
|26–5
|align=left| Hennie Thoonen
|TKO
|6
|1976-10-09
|align=left| Antwerp, Belgium
|align=left|
|-
|Loss
|25–5
|align=left| Hennie Thoonen
|DQ
|5
|1976-05-31
|align=left| Rotterdam Ahoy Sportpaleis, Rotterdam, Netherlands
|align=left|
|-
|Win
|25–4
|align=left| Ba Sounkalo
|PTS
|10
|1976-05-07
|align=left| Izegem, Belgium
|align=left|
|-
|Loss
|24–4
|align=left| Muhammad Ali
|KO
|5
|1976-02-20
|align=left| Roberto Clemente Coliseum, Hato Rey, Puerto Rico
|align=left|WBC/WBA Heavyweight Titles. Coopman knocked out at 2:46 of the fifth round.
|-
|Win
|24–3
|align=left| Lisimo Obutobe
|TKO
|7
|1975-11-01
|align=left| Izegem, Belgium
|align=left|
|-
|Win
|23–3
|align=left| Domingo Silveira
|PTS
|10
|1975-10-04
|align=left| Antwerp, Belgium
|align=left|
|-
|Win
|22–3
|align=left| Terry Daniels
|DQ
|7
|1975-05-17
|align=left| Antwerp, Belgium
|align=left|
|-
|Win
|21–3
|align=left| Karsten Honhold
|TKO
|6
|1975-04-12
|align=left| Menen, Belgium
|align=left|
|-
|Win
|20–3
|align=left| Jan Lubbers
|PTS
|10
|1975-03-14
|align=left| Bruges, Belgium
|align=left|
|-
|Win
|19–3
|align=left| Adriano Rosati
|TKO
|5
|1975-02-21
|align=left| Izegem, Belgium
|align=left|
|-
|Win
|18–3
|align=left| Charley Green
|KO
|8
|1975-01-17
|align=left| Ghent, Belgium
|align=left|
|-
|Win
|17–3
|align=left| Vasco Faustino
|PTS
|10
|1974-12-25
|align=left| Izegem, Belgium
|align=left|
|-
|Win
|16–3
|align=left| Bernd August
|PTS
|10
|1974-11-22
|align=left| Ghent, Belgium
|align=left|
|-
|Win
|15–3
|align=left| Lino Finotti
|KO
|4
|1974-11-01
|align=left| Izegem, Belgium
|align=left|
|-
|Win
|14–3
|align=left| Rocky Campbell
|KO
|6
|1974-09-27
|align=left| Turnhout, Belgium
|align=left|
|-
|Loss
|13–3
|align=left| Rudie Lubbers
|PTS
|10
|1974-04-27
|align=left| Ghent, Belgium
|align=left|
|-
|Win
|13–2
|align=left| Ferenc Kristofcsak
|DQ
|3
|1974-02-22
|align=left| Roulers, Belgium
|align=left|
|-
|Win
|12–2
|align=left| Ireno Werleman
|KO
|1
|1974-01-25
|align=left| Izegem, Belgium
|align=left|
|-
|Win
|11–2
|align=left| Jean Belval
|PTS
|6
|1973-12-23
|align=left| Izegem, Belgium
|align=left|
|-
|Win
|10–2
|align=left| Horst Lang
|KO
|3
|1973-11-16
|align=left| Ghent, Belgium
|align=left|
|-
|Win
|9–2
|align=left| Erwin Josefa
|KO
|3
|1973-11-01
|align=left| Izegem, Belgium
|align=left|
|-
|Win
|8–2
|align=left| Juan Rodriguez
|TKO
|3
|1973-09-08
|align=left| Izegem, Belgium
|align=left|
|-
|Loss
|7–2
|align=left| Ireno Werleman
|KO
|2
|1973-05-18
|align=left| Izegem, Belgium
|align=left|
|-
|Win
|7–1
|align=left| Ray Philippe
|KO
|5
|1973-05-05
|align=left| Ghent, Belgium
|align=left|
|-
|Win
|6–1
|align=left| Ermanno Festorazzi
|PTS
|6
|1973-03-16
|align=left| Ingelmunster, Belgium
|align=left|
|-
|Win
|5–1
|align=left| Gino Martinis
|PTS
|6
|1973-02-16
|align=left| Ingelmunster, Belgium
|align=left|
|-
|Loss
|4–1
|align=left| Harald Skog
|PTS
|6
|1973-01-25
|align=left| Messehallen, Oslo, Norway
|align=left|
|-
|Win
|4–0
|align=left| Kilani Ramdani
|PTS
|6
|1972-12-25
|align=left| Izegem, Belgium
|align=left|
|-
|Win
|3–0
|align=left| Antonio Rimasti
|KO
|4
|1972-12-08
|align=left| Tournai, Belgium
|align=left|
|-
|Win
|2–0
|align=left| Siegfried Ackers
|TKO
|2
|1972-11-01
|align=left| Izegem, Belgium
|align=left|
|-
|Win
|1–0
|align=left| Norbert Suehrig
|TKO
|3
|1972-09-29
|align=left| Menen, Belgium
|align=left|

References

Living people
1946 births
Sportspeople from West Flanders
Heavyweight boxers
European Boxing Union champions
Belgian male boxers
People from Ingelmunster